K-Paz de la Sierra is a Mexican Duranguense band that was formed in Chicago, Illinois, United States.

About
The group was formed in the summer of 2001 by an idea of Armando Rodríguez, Tambora, now with AK-7 and Juan Loredo, owner and artist developer of Brazeros Musical, father of Jair Loredo, drummer, with the help of Rafael Solís, Keyboard, ex-member of Grupo Montez de Durango, Simon Valtíerrez Valles, keyboard, ex-member of Grupo Montez de Durango, Sergio Gómez, Oscar Zepeda, keyboard, (now La Autoridad De La Sierra), and José Luis Corral, keyboard, (now La Autoridad De La Sierra).

While working together for Montez de Durango, Sergio Gómez met Armando Rodríguez (then driver for Montez), and Rafael Solís, invited him to form a musical group since they had heard him sing in a private event to cover for lead vocals singer of Montez, Alfredo Ramirez Corral (now Los Creadorez), at a private venue, then to go on to became lead vocals for K-Paz De La Sierra in the newly created "Pasito Duranguense" musical genre.

This musical project began with an idea of Armando and Juan Loredo, then to integrate Rafael and Simon, along with Sergio who at that time worked in as a sound engineer for Montez de Durango, forming K-Paz de la Sierra together. The name was an idea by Juan Loredo's wife to name it "Capaz", meaning "able", then Armando and Juan went to see Joey Guerrero of Musica Y Mas Magazine in Chicago (now Pastor Jose N Guerrero of Gloria A Dios Church), to create the name logo design, and utilizing creativity was then named "K-Paz De La Sierra", where Joey also created the slogan "Arrazando Con Fuego" which later was used as their first CD Title.

K-Paz de la Sierra became well known in the United States, México, Center and South America, in just the first two months of the band's debut they were able to capture the hearts of many, surpassing their popularity in México over Montez de Durango by far.

The company Procan (Virgilio Canales - Grupo Liberacion) and Disa Records (Discos Sabinas), who were their main Label and promoting company.

Band members
Current band members are:
 Jesus “Chuy” Morales (1ra Voz)
 Luis Guadarama (2da Voz)
 Humberto "Beto" Duran (1ra Y 2da Voz)
 Emmanuel Garibo (1ra Y 2da Voz)
 Gabriel Frias (Teclados 1ro)
 Angel Asaf (Batería)
 Victor Cardoso (Tuba Eléctrica)
 Jose Antonio Guerrero (Teclados 2do)
 Jorge "El Jagsx" Garduño (Tuba Electrica)

Former members
Former band members were: Sergio Gómez, Juan Gómez, Sergio Caballero, Miguel Galindo, Oscar Ledezma, Gerardo Ramírez, Luis Díaz , Armando Rodríguez, Carmelo Gamboa, José Luis Corral, Luis García, Alfredo Hernández, Rafael Solís, Jair Loredo, Luis Vidales, Guillermo Rocha, Rafael Ayon, Gabriel Guadarrama

History

La Autoridad de la Sierra
In October 2004, following their 2nd album, Pensando En Ti, 4 Original Members: Jair Loredo, Oscar Zepeda, Simon Valtierrez, and Jose Luis Corral, left to form La Autoridad De La Sierra along Arturo Palomar, Juan Soberanis and Pedro Vargas. Jair Loredo returned to K-Paz in 2007.

AK-7
On May 28, 2007, Sergio Gomez wanted to be a solo artist with the name of K-Paz Dela Sierra, and because of this, all band members excluding Beto Duran left the group to form AK-7, which stands for "Antes K-Paz", which translates literally to "Before K-Paz" signaling that they were once K-paz.  The 7 refers to the number of members who left K-Paz.

Majestad de la Sierra
In the middle of 2008, 5 members separated and created a new musical group also of the Duranguense genre with the name of Majestad De La Sierra. The 3rd separation originated in a conflict with Juán Gómez brother of the deceased Sergio Gómez and with Beto Duran, because the latter canceled the recording of an album in Monterrey.

On January 29, 2009, K-Paz presented new members under the direction of Juan Gómez (brother of the deceased vocalist) Kompendo de la Sierra:

 Miguel Galindo: Vocals
 Luis Eduardo Guadarrama: Vocals
 Sergio Caballero: Keyboard and Musical Director
 Gabriel Guadarrama: Keyboard
 Fernando del Valle: Electric Tuba
 Juan Gómez: Tambora
 Jorge Garduño: Electric Tuba
 Jair Loredo: Drums

With a new image, a new voice, but with a stronger name than ever, K-Paz de la Sierra, after his great success of Como un Tatuaje, managed to get back on top of success and popularity, remaining when They released their second single to the radio, called "I'd like to be an idiot", which managed to be screened throughout the country and the American Union.

The album As a Tattoo, led them to be nominated for the OYE Awards! 2009, as Best Grupo Banda Duranguense, and subsequently to the Premio Lo Nuestro 2010 in the category of Duranguense Artist of the Year.

And it is also in 2010, that K-PAZ DE LA SIERRA launches a third promotional cut, this is Armando Manzanero's classic "Adoro", a duo with Lupe Esparza, the Lead Singer & Bass Player of Bronco/Gigante De America in a vibrant Duranguense version.

K-Paz de la Sierra continues forward. Because the success of the group has not been even a simple fashion, and the proof of it is shown in countries like Mexico, the United States, Spain, Guatemala, Nicaragua, Honduras and El Salvador. K-Paz de la Sierra is a concrete phenomenon, of which only appear each time, and proof of them was their participation in the recording of the song and the classic video of Michael Jackson "We are the world", which in its Spanish version ( "We are the world") was designed and produced by Emilio Estefan, who extended the invitation to the group so that part of this project to help Haiti, for the earthquake suffered.

"For life" is the new title of the album of K-Paz de la Sierra, and also the phrase that carries the banner with his desire that his music last forever in the minds and hearts of the public. This is what he has followed during his years of trajectory.

In this album K-Paz de la Sierra includes in its total unreleased tracks, one of them being the one that has been released as the first single and that is entitled "Ni se se ocurra". duet included in the production. But this one was special, since it was recorded next to Mr. Sergio Vega "el Shaka", thus being the last musical recording made by the singer of the band before his death.

This album has 10 songs that allow you to listen to songs by the composers of the likes of Horacio Palencia, Claudia Brant, Edgar Cortázar, Oswaldo Villarreal and Aaron Martínez, Sergio Caballero and Jair Loredo. From this album comes the second single titled "Me Tienes Embrujado", authored by Sergio Caballero and Jair Loredo. Reaching the first places of popularity in Mexico and the United States.

Now the Group is preparing Dos Mega Producciones, their new Disco album, which can already be heard a super theme that was made with the Chino Y Nacho Artists, the theme taken by title "The Poet" that will be added to the new album as a bonus track. Adding the Celebration of its Tenth Anniversary, which was celebrated in December 2012. They anticipated that they would do a compilation of performances by Sergio Gómez, where they would be singing through the screens Together with K-paz De La Sierra That Great Night. This celebration is for the public that saw the birth of this Association.

Felicitas, widow of Gómez 
In 2011, K-Paz De La Sierra suffers a further break from his disciples Juan Gómez and Miguel Galindo due to mismanagement of the group.

In 2012 the group suffered another collapse, leaving their archives, Sergio Caballero (keyboardist) and Jair Loredo (drummer) for alleged salary debit by Felicitas. In October 2012 the group of Felicitas, launched "El Fuerte" and for May 2014 launched "En Esta Cantina".

K-Paz de la Sierra 2016 to the present 
In April 2016 the lawsuit for the name of K-Paz De La Sierra came to an end, Sergio Gómez's widow, Felicitas Gómez, won, even with threats that Juan Gómez could go to jail, also in mid-2016 Sergio Caballero returns to the ranks of K-Paz de la Sierra.

At the moment the group prepares its new record production for October of this 2016 called "Indestructible", same that will count on subjects of Horacio Palencia (Cambiemos el Trato), Luciano Moon (Le Atine), Gabriel Flowers (Quien Invento El Amor), Cecilia Cádiz / Pablo Castro (Para Amarte) and Sergio Caballero (Indestructible) theme that emerges as the first single. After the lawsuit the official alignment of K-Paz de la Sierra was as follows:

  Luis Eduardo Guadarrama: voice
  Jorge Garduño: Electric Tuba
  Gabriel Guadarrama: Keyboards
  Romelio Crespo: Tambora
  Frank Sánchez: Battery

During 2017 K-Paz De La Sierra has been touring throughout the United States and Mexico, making known who they are and have always been, although they wage a battle against ex-member Juan Gómez, who continues to use the name of K-Paz De La Sierra illegally in other countries of Central and South America deceiving the faithful followers of this group. Its members always invite businessmen not to be cheated or cheated by these misleading groups that only hurt the fans of K-Paz De La Sierra.

Currently, the group conducts international tours in Central America with resounding success in Guatemala, along with the resounding success it had in his first visit to Colombia, where his fans sang all the repertoire of the group without losing the smallest detail.

Discography

Albums
2003: Arrasando Con Fuego
2004: Pensando En Ti
2005: Más Capaces que Nunca
2006: Conquistando Corazones
2007: Capaz de Todo Por Ti
2009: Como Un Tatuaje
2011: Para Toda La Vida

Compilations
2004: 20 Éxitos Con La Fuerza Duranguense
2008: Una Historia
2009: Con Banda

Live albums
2004: En Vivo
2008: En Vivo: Desde el Auditorio Nacional

Singles
2003 Con Olor a Hierba
2003 Jambalaya
2003 Imposible Olvidarte
2004 Volveré
2004 Mi Vecinita
2004 Si Tu Te Fueras De Mi
2005 Mi Credo
2005 Pero Te Vas Arrepentir (ft. Jose Manuel Zamacona) 
2005 Silueta De Cristal
2006 Y Aqui Estoy (ft. Ana Gabriel) 
2006 Procuro olvidarte
2006 Amor Mío
2007 Un Buen Perdedor (ft. Franco De Vita)
2007 Volveré
2007 Al Diablo Con Los Guapos (No Me Supiste Querer)(ft. Allisson Lozz)
2008 Querido Amigo
2009 Como Un Tatuaje
2009 Adoro (ft. Lupe Esparza) 
2010 Ni Se Te Ocurra (ft. Sergio Vega “El Shaka”) 
2012: El Poeta Ft "Chino y Nacho" Producer Sergio Caballero 
2013: El Fuerte
2014: En Esta Cantina
2017: Indestructible Producer and Composer Sergio Caballero
2018: Ella Homenaje a "Jose Alfredo Jimenez"
2018:Desde Hoy
2021:Volver A Enamorarme
2022:Mujer Ardiente

See also
AK-7

References
www.kpazdelasierra.tk
facebook.com/KpazOficial

Duranguense music groups
Musical groups established in 2002
Musical groups from Chicago